Coedpenmaen railway station served the  Coedpenmaen district of Pontypridd, Glamorganshire, Wales, from 1900 to 1932 on the Llancaiach Branch.

History 
The station was opened on 1 June 1900 by the Taff Vale Railway. The last train was on 1 June 1915 but the station officially closed on 12 September 1932.

References 

Disused railway stations in Rhondda Cynon Taf
Railway stations in Great Britain opened in 1900
Railway stations in Great Britain closed in 1915
1900 establishments in Wales
1932 disestablishments in Wales
Former Taff Vale Railway stations